[[File:Katz's Delicatessen 2004.jpg|thumb|right|Katz's Delicatessen, a popular Jewish deli on the Lower East Side in New York City, which has featured prominently in American popular culture and films such as ''"When Harry Met Sally".]]

A Jewish deli, also known as a Jewish delicatessen''', is a delicatessen establishment that serves various traditional dishes in Ashkenazi Jewish cuisine, and are typically known for their sandwiches such as pastrami on rye, as well as their soups such as matzo ball soup, among other dishes. Most of them are in the Ashkenazi style, due to the history of the Jewish diaspora that has sometimes been adapted to local taste preferences, as in the American Jewish cuisine. Jewish  delicatessens serve a variety of Jewish dishes, and many are also kosher-certified, while some are kosher-style and do not mix meat and dairy in the same dish, while others serve food with no dietary restrictions such as the Reuben sandwich. Jewish delis feature prominently in Jewish culture, as well as in general American popular culture, particularly in the cities of New York, Chicago and Los Angeles as well as in Canada, especially in Montreal and Toronto. The United Kingdom, particularly London has also historically had Jewish delis.

References

External links
Rachel Simon recalls her family's Kosher Deli Restaurant on Mermaid Avenue - Brooklyn, NY - Interview conducted by the Coney Island History Project

Jewish cuisine
Jewish culture
American culture
 
Restaurants by type